Alfred Henry John Cochrane (26 January 1865 – 14 December 1948) was an English  cricketer who played first-class cricket for Derbyshire between 1884 and 1886, and for Oxford University between 1885 and 1888. He subsequently made his name as a writer on sporting subjects and of light verse.

Cochrane was the second son of Rev. David Crawford Cochrane, Master of Etwall Hospital (almshouses) and his wife Jane Tomlinson. He was born Moka, Mauritius where his father was at the time Chaplain to the Bishop. He was educated at Repton School and made his debut for Derbyshire in the 1884 season in August against Lancashire, when he took 6 for 51. He played two more matches for Derbyshire during the season. He also played football for Derby County in 1884 in its pre-league days.

Cochrane went on to Hertford College, Oxford and played cricket more regularly for University over the next four years, taking part three times in the Varsity match. He played two matches for Derbyshire in the 1885 season, neither of which was against a first-class side, and played only in the Derbyshire match against the Australians in the 1886 season. In 28 first-class matches he took 103 wickets with his left arm medium pace, with a best performance of 7 for 66, at an average of just 18.99.

Cochrane moved to Northumberland when he joined Armstrong Whitworth, becoming secretary of the company. There, he played minor county cricket for Northumberland. In January, 1910 he unsuccessfully contested Tyneside, and from 1912 to 1927 he served as a member of the River Tyne Commission. Cochrane was a governor of his old school, Repton, from 1921 to 1944.

Cochrane had a skill at writing light verse, and his writing had a graceful touch. He wrote of cricket – the "uncertain game" – and of "the man who snicketh the length ball." He was interested in the nineteenth-century writers of light verse, especially in J K S (James Kenneth Stephen) and Winthrop Mackworth Praed with whom his verse was compared. Of football he wrote in the poem "To Anthea".

I once admitted—to my shame—
That football was a brutal game.
Because She hates it.

Later he recalled with nostalgia the expeditions in the Highlands of his youth, and lamented that "the way, though once it was short, is long."   He contributed to The Times for many years on sporting topics, especially on cricket.

Cochrane died at Batheaston, Somerset at the age of 83.

Cochrane married in 1895 Ethel Noble youngest daughter of Sir Andrew Noble, 1st Baronet. He was the brother of Sir Arthur Cochrane a distinguished member of the College of Arms and Charles Walter Hamilton Cochrane of the Federated Malay States service.

Publications

"The Kestrel's Nest" 1894
"Leviore Plectro" 1896
"Told in the Pavilion" 1896
"Collected Verses" 1903
"The Sweeper of the Leaves" 1908
"Later Verses" 1918
"Records of the Harlequins" 1930
 and verses and articles for Newspapers and Magazines.

References

External links

cricinfo

1865 births
1948 deaths
People educated at Repton School
Alumni of Hertford College, Oxford
Oxford University cricketers
Northumberland cricketers
Derbyshire cricketers
Derby County F.C. players
English writers
English cricketers
Gentlemen cricketers
Association footballers not categorized by position
English footballers